This article comprises three sortable tables of major mountain peaks of the U.S. State of Arizona.

The summit of a mountain or hill may be measured in three principal ways:
The topographic elevation of a summit measures the height of the summit above a geodetic sea level.  The first table below ranks the 20 highest major summits of Arizona by elevation.
The topographic prominence of a summit is a measure of how high the summit rises above its surroundings.  The second table below ranks the 20 most prominent summits of Arizona.
The topographic isolation (or radius of dominance) of a summit measures how far the summit lies from its nearest point of equal elevation.  The third table below ranks the 20 most isolated major summits of Arizona.


Highest major summits

Of the highest major summits of Arizona, Humphreys Peak exceeds  of elevation, five peaks exceed , and 14 peaks exceed  of elevation.

Most prominent summits

Most isolated major summits

Of the most isolated major summits of Arizona, Humphreys Peak and Baldy Peak exceed  of topographic isolation and seven peaks exceed  of topographic isolation.

Gallery

See also

List of mountain peaks of North America
List of mountain peaks of Greenland
List of mountain peaks of Canada
List of mountain peaks of the Rocky Mountains
List of mountain peaks of the United States
List of mountain peaks of Alaska

List of mountains of Arizona
List of mountains and hills of Arizona by height
List of mountain ranges of Arizona
List of mountain peaks of California
List of mountain peaks of Colorado
List of mountain peaks of Hawaii
List of mountain peaks of Idaho
List of mountain peaks of Montana
List of mountain peaks of Nevada
List of mountain peaks of New Mexico
List of mountain peaks of Oregon
List of mountain peaks of Utah
List of mountain peaks of Washington (state)
List of mountain peaks of Wyoming
List of mountain peaks of México
List of mountain peaks of Central America
List of mountain peaks of the Caribbean
Arizona
Geography of Arizona
:Category:Mountains of Arizona
commons:Category:Mountains of Arizona
Physical geography
Topography
Topographic elevation
Topographic prominence
Topographic isolation

Notes

References

External links

United States Geological Survey (USGS)
Geographic Names Information System @ USGS
United States National Geodetic Survey (NGS)
Geodetic Glossary @ NGS
NGVD 29 to NAVD 88 online elevation converter @ NGS
Survey Marks and Datasheets @ NGS
Bivouac.com
Peakbagger.com
Peaklist.org
Peakware.com
Summitpost.org

 

Mountain peaks
Arizona, List Of Mountain Peaks Of
Arizona, List Of Mountain Peaks Of
Arizona, List Of Mountain Peaks Of
Arizona, List Of Mountain Peaks Of
Arizona, List Of Mountain Peaks Of